Kumarina is a town located in Western Australia along the Great Northern Highway between the towns of Meekatharra and Newman. It contains a roadhouse and a caravan park, as well as a small wildlife sanctuary, tavern, motel and restaurant.

At the 2016 census, Kumarina and the surrounding area had a population of 54.

References

External links

Mining towns in Western Australia
Towns in Western Australia
Roadhouses in Western Australia
Shire of Meekatharra